TP-003 is an anxiolytic drug with a novel chemical structure, which is used in scientific research. It has similar effects to benzodiazepine drugs, but is structurally distinct and so is classed as a nonbenzodiazepine anxiolytic. It is a positive allosteric modulator at the benzodiazepine binding site of GABAA receptors. It has modest anticonvulsant activity although less than that of diazepam.

See also 
 Imidazopyridine
 L-838,417

References 

Tertiary alcohols
Anxiolytics
GABAA receptor positive allosteric modulators
Imidazopyridines
Nitriles
Fluoroarenes